Admiral Henderson may refer to:

George R. Henderson (1893–1964), U.S. Navy vice admiral
Iain Henderson (Royal Navy officer) (born 1948), British Royal Navy rear admiral
Nigel Henderson (1909–1993), British Royal Navy admiral
Reginald Henderson (1881–1939), British Royal Navy admiral
Reginald Friend Hannam Henderson (1846–1932), British Royal Navy admiral
Robert Henderson (Royal Navy officer) (1778–1843), British Royal Navy rear admiral
William Hannam Henderson (1845–1931), British Royal Navy admiral
William Henderson (Royal Navy officer) (1788–1854), British Royal Navy rear admiral